Alexander Kröckel (also spelled Kroeckel; born 12 March 1990) is a German skeleton racer who has competed since 2003. 2007 he joined the German national squad. He won Junior World Championships in 2011 and was second in 2010. 2011–12 Skeleton World Cup he finished 5th.

References

External links 

 
 
 
 

1990 births
Living people
German male skeleton racers
Skeleton racers at the 2014 Winter Olympics
Olympic skeleton racers of Germany
People from Suhl
Sportspeople from Thuringia
20th-century German people
21st-century German people